O. concinna may refer to:

 Oriens concinna, a skipper butterfly
 Orimarga concinna, a crane fly
 Otidea concinna, an apothecial fungus